The 194th Fighter Squadron (194 FS) is a unit of the California Air National Guard's 144th Fighter Wing (144 FW) at Fresno Air National Guard Base, California. The 194th is equipped with the F-15 Eagle and like its parent wing, the 144th Griffins, is operationally-gained within the active U.S. Air Force by the Air Combat Command (ACC).

History

World War II
Activated in October 1943 as the 409th Fighter Squadron at Hamilton Field, California.   During World War II, the squadron was an Operational Training Unit (OTU), equipped with second-line P-39 Airacobras and P-40 Warhawks.  Its mission was to train newly graduated pilots from Training Command in combat tactics and maneuvers before being assigned to their permanent combat unit.   Initially assigned to IV Fighter Command, then transferred to III Fighter Command in 1944, being re-equipped with P-51D Mustangs.  It took part in air-ground maneuvers and demonstrations, participating in the Louisiana Maneuvers in the summer of 1944 and in similar activities in the US until after V-J Day.

Inactivated in November 1945.

California Air National Guard

The wartime 409th Fighter Squadron was re-activated and re-designated as the 194th Fighter Squadron, and was allotted to the California Air National Guard, on 24 May 1946. It was organized at Naval Air Station Alameda, California, and was extended federal recognition on 25 June 1948 by the National Guard Bureau. The 194th Fighter Squadron was bestowed to the history, honors, and colors of the 409th Fighter Squadron. The squadron was equipped with F-51D Mustangs and was assigned to the CA ANG 144th Fighter Group.  During its early years with the F-51D, the unit earned prominence as one of the Air Force's most respected aerial gunnery competitors.

Air Defense

With the surprise invasion of South Korea on 25 June 1950, and the regular military's complete lack of readiness, most of the Air National Guard was federalized placed on active duty.   The F-51Ds were exchanged for F-51H Mustangs in 1951, as the "D" model of the Mustang was needed for close air support missions in Korea.   The F-51H was a Very Long Range version of the Mustang, which was developed to escort B-29 Superfortress bombers to Japan, but not considered rugged enough to be used in Korea.  The increased range, however was well-suited for air defense interceptor alert flights.   During its years with the P-51H, the unit earned prominence as one of the Air Force's most respected aerial gunnery competitors. In June 1953, while still flying the Mustang, the unit qualified for the first all-jet, worldwide gunnery meet.

With the increased availability of jet aircraft after the Korean War, the squadron's aircraft were upgraded from the piston-engine, propeller driven F-51H to its first jet aircraft, the F-86A Sabre Day Interceptor in 1954. At the same time, the 194th relocated to Fresno Yosemite International Airport (known at the time as Fresno Air Terminal), followed by the wing in 1957.  On 7 July 1955, the 144th was re-designated as the 194th Fighter-Interceptor Wing, a designation kept by the squadron for the next 37 years.  With the F-86A, the 144th began standing dusk-to-dawn alerts, joining its Air Defense Command active-duty counterparts.

The 194th continued to fly the F-86A until 31 March 1958. On 1 April 1958, the transition was made to the F-86L Sabre Interceptor, which was designed from the onset as an interceptor, had all-weather capability and was able to be used in all weather.   In addition, the F-86L could be controlled and directed by the SAGE computer-controlled Ground Control Interceptor (Radar) sites which would vector the aircraft to the unidentified target for interception.

The 144th continued to fly the F-86A until 31 March 1958. On 1 April 1958, the transition was made to the F-86L, which was flown until 30 June 1964. On 1 July 1964, the 144th began flying the F-102 and continued flying this aircraft until 24 July 1974. On 25 July 1974, the 144th brought the F-106 into service, and continued to fly this aircraft until 31 December 1983. On 1 October 1978 Aerospace Defense Command was inactivated, its units being reassigned to Air Defense, Tactical Air Command (ADTAC). which was established compatible to a Numbered Air Force under TAC.   TAC replaced the aging F-106s on 1 January 1984 with F-4D Phantom IIs, being used in the air defense interceptor mission.

Modern era

The squadron started receiving their first F-16A Fighting Falcons on 1 October 1989. These were of the block 15 type, replacing the F-4D in the air defense and attack roles. The block 15 airframes weren’t exactly suited to the dedicated air defense mission the squadron was tasked to. This was fixed with the Air Defense Fighter (ADF) upgrade these aircraft received during 1990.

Effective 16 March 1992, the 144th Fighter Interceptor Wing was redesignated as the 144th Fighter Wing (144th FW), with all related Fighter Interceptor Groups and Squadrons becoming Fighter Groups and Fighter Squadrons.  On 1 June 1992, the 144th FW was reassigned to Air Combat Command.

During this time the 194th FS also had an alert detachment at George AFB. This base was closed in 1992 due to the overall downsizing after the Cold War and the alert detachment moved to March Air Force Base. In 1995 the squadron transitioned to the more F-16C Fighting Falcon block 25 aircraft.

After having flown for 11 years with the block 25 airframes, a number of those came to the end of their operational lifespan. It was therefore decided that the airframes of the 194th FS were to be replaced with F-16C Block 32 aircraft. The conversion to these block 32 models started in December 2006 and was gradually completed by the end of 2007.

The first F-15 Eagle arrived 18 June 2013. The last F-16 Fighting Falcon flew to its new home in Tucson, Arizona on 7 November 2013.

Lineage

 Constituted 409th Fighter Squadron on 12 October 1943
 Activated on 15 October 1943
 Re-designated: 409th Fighter-Bomber Squadron on 5 April 1944
 Re-designated: 409th Fighter Squadron on 5 June 1944.
 Inactivated on 7 November 1945
 Re-designated: 194th Fighter Squadron, and allocated to California ANG on 24 May 1946
 Extended federal recognition on 25 June 1948
 Re-designated: 194th Fighter-Interceptor Squadron, 1 October 1952
 Re-designated: 194th Fighter-Bomber Squadron, 1 December 1952
 Re-designated: 194th Fighter-Interceptor Squadron, 7 July 1955
 Re-designated: 194th Fighter Squadron, 16 March 1992

Assignments
 372d Fighter (Later Fighter-Bomber, Fighter) Group, 15 October 1943 – 7 November 1945
 144th Fighter Group, 25 June 1948
 144th Fighter Wing, 31 October 1950
 144th Fighter-Interceptor Wing, 1 October 1952
 144th Fighter-Bomber Wing, 1 December 1952
 144th Fighter-Interceptor Wing, 7 July 1955
 144th Operations Group, 16 March 1992 – Present

Stations

 Hamilton Field, California, 15 October 1943
 Portland Army Air Base, Oregon, 7 December 1943
 Esler Army Airfield, Louisiana, 25 March 1944
 Pollock Army Airfield, Louisiana, 15 April 1944
 Esler Army Airfield, Louisiana, 9 February 1945

 Alexandria Army Air Base, Louisiana, 14 Sep – 7 November 1945
 Naval Air Station Alameda, California, 25 June 1948
 Hayward Air National Guard Base, California, 1949
 Fresno Yosemite International Airport, California, 1954
 Designated: Fresno Air National Guard Base, California, 1991–Present

Aircraft

 P-39 Airacobra, 1943–1944
 P-40 Warhawk, 1944–1945
 P-51 Mustang, 1945
 F-51 Mustang, 1948–1954
 F-86A Sabre, 1954–1958
 F-86L Sabre, 1958–1964
 F-102 Delta Dagger, 1965–1974
 F-106 Delta Dart, 1974–1983
 F-4D Phantom II, 1983–1989
 F-16A Fighting Falcon, 1989–1995
 F-16C/D Fighting Falcon, 1995 – 2013
 F-15C/D Eagle, 2013–present

References

 Maurer, Maurer. Combat Squadrons of the Air Force: World War II. Maxwell Air Force Base, Alabama: Office of Air Force History, 1982.
 http://www.globalsecurity.org/military/agency/usaf/194fs.htm
 history of the 144th
 Rogers, B. (2006). United States Air Force Unit Designations Since 1978. 
  Cornett, Lloyd H. and Johnson, Mildred W., A Handbook of Aerospace Defense Organization  1946–1980, Office of History, Aerospace Defense Center, Peterson AFB, CO (1980).
 F-15 Eagle Replaces the F-16 Fighting Falcon  http://www.nationalguard.mil/news/archives/2013/06/062013-Eagle.aspx
 194th Fighter Squadron@f-16.net

External links

Squadrons of the United States Air National Guard
Fighter squadrons of the United States Air Force
Military units and formations in California